The 2015 Abilene Christian Wildcats football team represented Abilene Christian University in the 2015 NCAA Division I FCS football season. The Wildcats were in their third transition season of at the FCS level. They were led by fourth-year head coach Ken Collums. They play their home games at Shotwell Stadium. This was the Wildcats second season in the Southland Conference since their return to the conference. They finished the season 3–8, 3–6 in Southland play to finish in a three-way tie for eighth place.

Previous season
The 2014 season marked the second year of the Wildcats transition to NCAA Division I (FCS).  It also marked the first season with a full Southland Conference schedule since returning to the conference.  They finished the season with a 6–6 record overall and with a 4–4 record in Southland play.

In out of conference play, the Wildcats recorded one win against an NCAA Division I (FBS) opponent, Troy.  The Wildcats were close to defeating another FBS team, Georgia State, losing in the last four seconds of the game after leading for most of the game.

Schedule
Source:

Game Summaries

@ (FBS) Fresno State

Sources:

Houston Baptist

Sources:

Stephen F. Austin

Sources:

@ Central Arkansas

Sources:

@ Lamar

Sources:

Sam Houston State

Sources:

@ Incarnate Word

Sources:

McNeese State

Sources:

@ Northwestern State

Sources:

Southeastern Louisiana

Sources:

@ Northern Colorado

Sources:

References

Abilene Christian
Abilene Christian Wildcats football seasons
Abilene Christian Wildcats football